Eberhard Ernst Gotthard von Vegesack (29 March 1763 – 30 October 1818) was a German-born officer in the Swedish Army who was active from the Russo-Swedish War to the Swedish–Norwegian War.

References 

1763 births
1818 deaths
Swedish generals
Swedish military personnel of the Finnish War
Eberhard